Steve Ancheta (born September 10, 1969 in Portland, Oregon) is a former U.S. soccer defender who played two seasons in the Western Soccer Alliance. Ancheta is currently the head coach at West Linn High School.

Player
Ancheta graduated from Reynolds High School.  He then attended Warner Pacific College, playing on the men’s soccer team in 1988 and 1989.  He then transferred to Oregon State University for the 1990 and 1991 season.  In 1988, he played as an amateur with the semi-professional F.C. Portland of the Western Soccer Alliance.  In 1989, Art Dixon, owner of the original Portland Timbers, purchased F.C. Portland and renamed it the Timbers.  Ancheta played the 1989 season with the renamed Timbers.  In 1992, he played for Portland Mailing, an amateur indoor team coached by John Bain.

Coach
Ancheta has spent the years since retiring as a player coaching on the youth level.  In 1995, he was hired as a staff coach with the F.C. Portland Academy.  In 1999, he was hired by Sam Barlow High School as the boys soccer coach.  In 2002, he left Barlow and in 2004 moved to Central Catholic High School.  In 2007, he took his team to the Oregon 6A high school soccer championship, winning Coach of the Year honors as well.  He was also on the staff of the F.C. Portland youth club during his time in Portland.

In July 2019, Ancheta joined West Linn High School as boys' head coach.

External links
 Portland Timbers profile
 Central Catholic coaching profile
 Western Oregon profile

References

1969 births
Living people
Sportspeople from Portland, Oregon
Soccer players from Portland, Oregon
Oregon State Beavers men's soccer players
Western Soccer Alliance players
Portland Timbers (1985–1990) players
American soccer coaches
Warner Pacific Knights men's soccer players
Association football defenders
Western Oregon Wolves women's soccer coaches
High school soccer coaches in the United States
Association football players not categorized by nationality